Shine is the tenth studio album from American country music singer Martina McBride, released on March 24, 2009 by RCA Nashville. The album spun three Top 20 hits on the Billboard country chart: "Ride" and "Wrong Baby Wrong" both reached #11, and "I Just Call You Mine" peaked at #18. McBride co-produced the album with Dann Huff and co-wrote the track "Sunny Side Up." It is her last studio album released through RCA Records before switching to Republic Nashville.

In November 2009, McBride began the Shine All Night Tour in support of the album.

Content
Shine was produced by McBride along with Dann Huff, and it is the first album of her career that Huff has co-produced. Dann was approached by McBride and her husband John to co-produce the record on Huff's birthday.  "Ride", the album's debut single, was released in November 2008 and peaked at #11 in April 2009. The follow-up single, "I Just Call You Mine", was sent to radio on May 18, 2009 and is being used in promos for NBC's "Today Wedding Show". It has also charted in the Top 20 of the Billboard Hot Country Songs chart. Shine marked McBride's fourth #1 album on the US Country Albums Charts, being one of the only women in country music to release three #1 albums consecutively. Also on the album, McBride released three top 20 singles, which marked her 24th, 25th and 26th top-20 singles on the US Top Country Singles chart.

Despite debuting at #10, the album spent just seven weeks on the Billboard 200. As of March 2010 the album has sold over 175,000 copies in the US.

"I'm Trying", co-written by Tia Sillers and Darrell Scott, was originally recorded by Kevin Sharp on his 1998 album Love Is, and later by Diamond Rio (as a collaboration with Chely Wright) on their 2001 album One More Day.

As with her last studio album, 2007's Waking Up Laughing, McBride has a co-writer's credit: the track "Sunny Side Up", which she co-wrote with Brad and Brett Warren, also known as The Warren Brothers. The Warren Brothers also co-wrote the lead-off track "Wrong Baby Wrong Baby Wrong" with Robert Ellis Orrall and Stephen Barker Liles, the latter of whom is a member of the band Love and Theft. Although McBride was not involved with the writing of "Wrong Baby Wrong", she helped with the idea, being that the song was originally written in a man's point of view talking to his girlfriend.

On the iTunes Store, a pre-order bonus track was available up to the day of the album's release. It was a cover of Leo Sayer's 1978 hit "I Can't Stop Loving You". This is a different song to the one recorded for Timeless.

Track listing

Personnel 
 Martina McBride – lead vocals, backing vocals
 Tim Akers – keyboards, Wurlitzer electric piano, Hammond B3 organ
 Charlie Judge – keyboards, acoustic piano, synthesizers, Hammond B3 organ, strings, programming, lap steel guitar, percussion
 Steve Nathan – keyboards, acoustic piano, clavinet, Hammond B3 organ
 Gordon Mote – acoustic piano 
 Tom Bukovac – electric guitar
 Dann Huff – acoustic guitar, electric guitar, mandolin
 Brent Mason – electric guitar
 Adam Shoenfeld – acoustic guitar, electric guitar
 Ilya Toshinsky – acoustic guitar, banjo, bouzouki, mandolin
 Jonathan Yudkin – mandolin
 Dan Dugmore – steel guitar
 Paul Franklin – steel guitar 
 Jimmie Lee Sloas – bass
 Glenn Worf – bass
 Matt Chamberlain – drums
 Shannon Forrest – drums
 Chris McHugh – drums
 Eric Darken – percussion
 Stuart Duncan – fiddle
 Sarah Buxton – backing vocals
 Lisa Cochran – backing vocals
 Jerry Flowers – backing vocals
 Carolyn Dawn Johnson – backing vocals 
 Harry Stinson – backing vocals
 Russell Terrell – backing vocals
 Jenifer Wrinkle – backing vocals

The Nashville String Machine (Tracks 5, 6 & 11)
 David Campbell – string arrangements and conductor
 Carl Gorodetzky – string contractor
 Pamela Sixfin – concertmaster 
 Kirsten Cassel and Carole Rabinowitz – cello 
 Jim Grosjean and Kristin Wilkinson – viola 
 David Angell, David Davidson, Conni Ellisor, Carl Gorodetzky, Pamela Sixfin, Alan Umstead, Cathy Umstead, Mary Kathryn Vanosdale and Karen Winklemann – violin

Production 
 Dann Huff – producer 
 Martina McBride – producer 
 Darrell Franklin – A&R 
 Scott McBride – recording, mixing (5, 7, 10, 11)
 Steve Bishir – additional recording 
 Allen Ditto – additional recording, recording assistant, mix assistant (5, 7, 10, 11)
 Mark Hagen – additional recording
 Seth Morton – recording assistant 
 Justin Niebank – mixing (1-4, 6, 8, 9)
 Drew Bollman – mix assistant (1-4, 6, 8, 9)
 John Netti – mix assistant (1-4, 6, 8, 9)
 Christopher Rowe – digital editing 
 Adam Ayan – mastering at Gateway Mastering (Portland, Maine)
 Mike "Frog" Griffith – production coordinator 
 Judy Forde-Blair – creative production, liner notes 
 Scott McDaniel – art direction 
 Tracy Baskette-Fleaner – design 
 Tammie Creek – imaging production 
 Kristin Barlowe – photography 
 Claudia Fowler – wardrobe stylist 
 Earl Cox – hair stylist 
 Mary Beth Felts – make-up
 Bruce Allen – management

Charts

Weekly charts

Year-end charts

Singles

References

External links
 

2009 albums
Martina McBride albums
RCA Records albums
Albums produced by Dann Huff